Bishop is a surname. Notable people with the surname include:

A–G
 A. C. Bishop (fl. late 19th century), American politician
 Abby Bishop (born 1988), Australian professional basketball player
 Adelaide Bishop (1928–2008), American operatic soprano, musical theatre actress, opera and stage director, and voice teacher
 Alec Bishop (1897–1984), British Army officer and administrator
 Alfred Bishop (disambiguation)
 Alison Bishop (disambiguation)
 Amanda Bishop, Australian actress
 Amasa Stone Bishop (1921–1997), American nuclear physicist
 Andrew Bishop (born 1985), Welsh international rugby union player
 Andy Bishop (born 1982), English footballer
 Angela Bishop (born 1967), Australian reporter and television presenter
 Ann Bishop (disambiguation)
 Arlene Bishop, Canadian lyricist, screenwriter, and singer-songwriter
 Arthur Bishop (disambiguation)
 Barbara Bishop (born 1956), Barbadian sprinter
 Barry Bishop (disambiguation)
 Ben Bishop (born 1986), American professional ice hockey goaltender
 Bernardine Bishop (1939–2013), English novelist, teacher and psychotherapist
 Bernice Pauahi Bishop (1831–1884), Princess of the Kamehameha dynasty
 Billy Bishop (1894–1956), Canadian First World War flying ace
 Bob Bishop (scout), Northern Irish football scout for Manchester United
 Braden Bishop (born 1993), American baseball player
 William Bradford Bishop (born 1936), American former U.S. Foreign Service officer accused of killing his family; better known as Bradford Bishop
 Bridget Bishop ( – 1692), the first person executed for witchcraft during the Salem witchcraft trials of 1692
 Bronwyn Bishop (born 1942), Australian politician
 Carl Whiting Bishop (1881–1942), American archeologist 
 Charles Reed Bishop (1822–1915), American businessman and philanthropist
 Christopher Bishop, British physicist and computer scientist
 Cindy Bishop (born 1978), Thai actress, model, TV personality and entrepreneur
 Claire Huchet Bishop (1898–1993), Swiss-American children's writer
 Dan Bishop (born 1964), member of the U.S. House of Representatives from North Carolina
 David Bishop (runner) (born 1987), British middle-distance athlete
 David Bishop (writer) (born 1966), New Zealand, screenwriter, author and comics editor
 Dorothy Bishop (early 21st c.), American entertainer 
 Dorothy V. M. Bishop (born 1952), British psychologist 
 Duffy Bishop, American blues singer and songwriter
 Edward Bishop (disambiguation)
 Elizabeth Bishop (1911–1979), American poet and writer
 Elvin Bishop (born 1942), American blues and rock 'n roll musician
 Jamie Foxx (birth name Eric Marlon Bishop, born 1967), American actor, singer and comedian
 Errett Bishop (1926–1983), American mathematician

H–M
 Harold Bishop (disambiguation)
 Harry Bishop (disambiguation)
 Henry Bishop (disambiguation)
 Howard Bishop, Hawaiian film and theatre actor
 Hunter Bishop (born 1998), American baseball player
 Ian Bishop (disambiguation), several people
 Isaac W. Bishop, 19th-century New York politician
 Jacqueline Bishop, Jamaican writer, visual artist and photographer
 James Bishop (disambiguation), several people
 Jermaine Bishop (born 1997), American basketball player
 Jerry G. Bishop (1936–2013), American radio and television personality
 Jesse Bishop (1933–1979), American convicted murderer
 Joey Bishop (1918–2007), American entertainer
 John Bishop (disambiguation), several people
 Joyce Bishop (1896–1993), English educator
 Julie Bishop (born 1956), Australian politician
 Julie Bishop (actress) (1914–2001), Hollywood leading lady of the 1930s and 40s
 K. J. Bishop, Australian writer and artist
 Katharine Bishop (1889–1976), co-discoverer of Vitamin E
 Kelly Bishop (born 1944), American actress
 Kevin Bishop (born 1980), English actor and comedian
 Kirsten Bishop (1963–2014), voice actress
 Malcolm Bishop, Welsh lawyer and QC
 Mark Bishop (born 1954), Australian Labor Party member
 Mary Agnes Dalrymple Bishop (1857–1934), American journalist, newspaper editor
 Maurice Bishop (1944–1983), Grenadian revolutionary and politician
 Max Bishop (1889–1962), American baseball player
 Meredith Bishop (born 1976), American actress
 Mervyn Bishop (born 1945), Australian photographer
 Michael Bishop (disambiguation), several people
 J. Michael Bishop (born 1938), American immunologist and microbiologist
 Morris Bishop (1893–1973), American scholar, historian, biographer, author, and humorist

N–Z
 Neal Bishop (born 1981), English footballer
 Nicholas Bishop (born 1973), Australian actor
 Raymond J. Bishop (1906–1978), Catholic priest and exorcist
 Richard M. Bishop (1812–1893), American politician from Ohio
 Rob Bishop (born 1951), Republican member of the U.S. House of Representatives
 Robert Bishop (artist), bondage artist, also known by the pseudonym "Bishop"
 Robert Hamilton Bishop (1777–1855), first president of Miami University
 Roswell P. Bishop (1843–1920), American politician from Michigan
 Rudine Sims Bishop (born 1937), US-American professor of literature
 Russell Bishop (disambiguation)
 Ruth Bishop (born 1933), Australian virologist
 Sarah Bishop, British journalist
 Seth Scott Bishop (1852–1923), American laryngologist
 Sherman C. Bishop (1887–1951), American herpetologist and arachnologist
 Sid Bishop (footballer, born 1900), died 1949, English international footballer with West Ham United, Leicester City and Chelsea
 Sid Bishop (footballer, born 1934), English footballer with Leyton Orient
 Stephen Bishop (disambiguation), several people
 Stuart Bishop (born ), member of the Louisiana House of Representatives
 Tim Bishop (born 1950), American politician from New York
 Vaughn Bishop, American intelligence officer currently serving as the deputy director of the Central Intelligence Agency (CIA)
 Vivien Bishop (born 1945), New Zealand painter
 Walter Bishop (disambiguation)
 Wesley T. Bishop (born 1967), American academic, lawyer, and politician

Characters 
On Coronation Street
Emily Bishop, one of the longest-running characters, appearing regularly between 1961 and 2016
Ernest Bishop, her husband, appearing initially at the wedding of popular character Elsie Tanner in 1967, and then regularly between 1969 and 1978 when the character was killed off
On Fringe
Peter Bishop, Department of Homeland Security (DHS) consultant and jack of all trades
Dr. Walter Bishop, scientist and DHS consultant
On Heroes (U.S. TV series)
 Elle Bishop
On Mad Men
Helen Bishop
On Neighbours
Harold Bishop
On New Girl
Winston Bishop
On NCIS
Ellie Bishop
On Station 19
Maya Bishop
On A Discovery of Witches
Diana Bishop
On the Marvel Universe
Kate Bishop (comics)
In Juice (film)
Roland Bishop
In Strike Witches
Lynette Bishop

See also
 Bishop (disambiguation)
 Bishop Bishop (disambiguation)
 Bishopp
 Bischof
 Bischoff
 The Bishops, respectively Michael and Peter Bishop

English-language surnames
Surnames of English origin
Occupational surnames
English-language occupational surnames